Tim Finn is the third studio album by New Zealand singer/songwriter Tim Finn. The album was released in April 1989 and peaked at number 8 in New Zealand and number 47 in Australia.

Critical reception

The reviewer in pan-European magazine Music & Media noted that the album "consists of 10 intelligent, well-crafted and introspective songs" and described Mitchell Froom's production as "pleasantly gritty and modest in a refined way".

Track listing

Personnel

 Tim Finn - vocals, guitar, keyboards
 Jerry Marotta - drums
 Tony Levin - bass
 Alex Acuña - percussion
 David Rhodes - guitar
 Neil Finn - backing vocals, guitar
 Tim Pierce - guitar
 Mitchell Froom - keyboards
 Noel Crombie - backing vocals
 Heart Attack Horns

Other sleeve notes

 Produced by Mitchell Froom
 Recorded & Mixed by Tchad Blake
 2nd Engineer - Mike Kloster
 Management: Gary Stamler, 2029 Century Park East, Suite 1500, Los Angeles, California 90067
 A&R Direction: Tom Whalley
 Recorded at Soundcastle, Sunset Sound Factory and Ocean Way Studios
 Mastered at Masterdisc by Bob Ludwig
 Thanks- Greta, Neil, Mitchell, Gary, Micki, Tom, Jeremy, and everyone at Capitol, the Finn family and everyone who helped make lean times fatter.
 Art and Design: SHEd

Charts

References

Tim Finn albums
1989 albums
Albums produced by Mitchell Froom
Capitol Records albums